Stelios Vasiliou (born 29 April 1991) is a Greek professional footballer who plays as a forward for Gamma Ethniki club Kallithea.

Career
Vasiliou started his career in Levadiakos.

However, in January 2014, Vasiliou is probably leaving Levadiakos after 6.5 years. The rupture in relations with the administration of the club is final. The young striker did not accept the new proposal was made for a two-year extension of his contract, which expires in December 2014. The player is resentful as it considers that the limited participation time of the season (11 appearances in the League) was the main reason not to sign a new contract. Levadiakos would probably seek to sell him during the summer transfer window, as from 1 July 2014 the player is entitled to sign to a club of his choice.

On 17 September 2014, he signed a three years' contract with Panetolikos for an undisclosed fee. On 22 July 2016, after 18 months with Panetolikos, he signed a year contract with his former club.
On 26 February 2017, he scored against PAS Giannina sealing a 2-1 home win in his club's effort to avoid relegation. It was his first goal for the club since January 2013. Moreover, the punishment of his teammate Vangelis Mantzios for doping, has been his passport in the basic line-up of the club where he scored in three consecutives games including a home Super League game against champions Olympiakos.

On 4 January 2018, he signed with Football League club Panachaiki for one-and-half-year contract for an undisclosed fee.

On 11 August 2018, he moved to newly promoted side Aittitos Spata on a free transfer.

References

 Guardian Football

1991 births
Living people
Greek footballers
Super League Greece players
Levadiakos F.C. players
Panetolikos F.C. players
Association football forwards
People from Boeotia
Footballers from Central Greece